Harrison Otálvaro Arce is a Colombian football player who plays as an attacking midfielder for Atlético Huila.

Career
Otálvaro joined the Argentine side Huracán for the 2010–11 Argentine Primera División season.

As a member of Colombia's Youth Team, he won the South American Youth Championship in 2005, and played the 2005 FIFA World Youth Championship. His team reached the round of 16, with Harrison scoring 1 goal.

Honours

Club
América de Cali
Categoría Primera A (1): 2008-II
Millonarios Fútbol Club
Categoría Primera A (1): 2012-II

References

External links
 América profile

1986 births
Living people
Colombian footballers
Colombian expatriate footballers
Colombia under-20 international footballers
Colombia youth international footballers
América de Cali footballers
FC Dynamo Kyiv players
Cúcuta Deportivo footballers
Club Atlético Huracán footballers
Al-Shamal SC players
Millonarios F.C. players
Atlético Nacional footballers
Deportes Tolima footballers
León de Huánuco footballers
Real Cartagena footballers
Atlético Huila footballers
Categoría Primera A players
Categoría Primera B players
Argentine Primera División players
Peruvian Primera División players
Qatari Second Division players
Footballers from Cali
Association football midfielders
Colombian expatriate sportspeople in Ukraine
Colombian expatriate sportspeople in Argentina
Colombian expatriate sportspeople in Peru
Colombian expatriate sportspeople in Qatar
Expatriate footballers in Ukraine
Expatriate footballers in Argentina
Expatriate footballers in Peru
Expatriate footballers in Qatar